The Women's +78 kg event at the 2010 South American Games was held on March 19.

Medalists

Results

Round Robin

Points system:

Contests

References

 Medalists

W79
South American Games 2010
South American Games W79